During the 1998–99 English football season, Middlesbrough competed in the FA Premier League (known as the FA Carling Premiership for sponsorship reasons).

Season summary
Middlesbrough were the only newly promoted side to avoid relegation in 1998–99. They attained an impressive ninth-place finish in the final table - too high for relegation, but not quite high enough for a UEFA Cup place; they even rose as high as fourth by Christmas after a surprise 3–2 win at Old Trafford against champions Manchester United but they drew 15 games throughout the league season which ultimately prevented them from finishing any higher. Still, it was their highest finish for more than 20 years and a step in the right direction for manager Bryan Robson – who had come close to European qualification (via the cup competitions) in the previous two campaigns.

Final league table

Results summary

Results by round

Results
Middlesbrough's score comes first

Legend

FA Premier League

FA Cup

League Cup

Squad

Left club during season

Reserve squad

Statistics

Appearances, goals and cards
(Starting appearances + substitute appearances)

Transfers

In

Out

Transfers in:  £9,600,000
Transfers out:  £7,250,000
Total spending:  £2,350,000

Notes

References

Middlesbrough F.C. seasons
Middlesbrough